During the 2005–06 English football season, Swansea City competed in Football League One.

Season summary
Swansea had a good season in League One, finishing in sixth place to take the last play-off spot. After beating Brentford 3–1 on aggregate in the semi-final, the Swans faced Barnsley in the final. After a 2–2 draw at the end of extra time, Barnsley won the penalty shoot-out 4–3. This form did not translate to the cup competitions, being knocked out in the first round of both.

First-team squad
Squad at end of season

Left club during season

References

2005-06
Welsh football clubs 2005–06 season
2005–06 Football League One by team